Ponta Delgada is a parish in the municipality of São Vicente on the island of Madeira. The population in 2011 was 1,363, in an area of 9.39 km2. Ponta Delgada is located on the north coast, 2 km west of Boa Ventura and 6 km east of São Vicente.

Climate

References

Ponta Delgada (Sao Vicente)